Johnny Ray Abrego (born July 4, 1962) is a former right-handed starting pitcher in Major League Baseball for the Chicago Cubs. His career was a brief one, as he was a member of the Cubs' starting rotation for the last month of the 1985 season. He also made one relief appearance during his brief career.

Abrego was drafted by the Philadelphia Phillies in the first round (20th pick) of the 1981 amateur player draft out of Mission San Jose High School in Fremont, California. Abrego missed the whole 1982 season due to reconstructive elbow surgery. The Cubs selected him in the Rule 5 draft in 1983. He was promoted to the Cubs in 1985 despite faring poorly in Triple-A, where he posted an 0–5 record and allowed 22 earned runs in 25 innings over five starts for an ERA of 7.92.

Once with the Cubs, Abrego went 1–1 with a 6.38 ERA. His lone major league win came on September 21, 1985, when he defeated the team that had drafted him, Philadelphia. He was back in Triple-A the next season, though his year was cut short by injury. After two mediocre seasons in the minors, the Cubs released him in 1987 at the age of 24. Abrego subsequently retired from baseball.

References

External links

Baseball Almanac

1962 births
Living people
Baseball players from California
Chicago Cubs players
Major League Baseball pitchers
People from Corpus Christi, Texas
Bend Phillies players
Helena Phillies players
Iowa Cubs players
Lodi Crushers players
Pittsfield Cubs players